Charles Harlin "Rabbit" Smith (March 13, 1924 – December 10, 2013) was an American football back who played one season with the Chicago Cardinals of the National Football League (NFL). He was drafted by the Chicago Cardinals in the 16th round of the 1947 NFL Draft. He played college football at the University of Georgia and attended Palatka High School in Palatka, Florida. He was nicknamed Rabbit for his speed.

Early years
Smith played high school football as a two-way back at Palatka High School. He was also a catcher and middle infielder on the baseball team, a forward in basketball and a jumper, sprinter and relay man in track. He graduated in 1943.

College career
Smith played college football and baseball for the Georgia Bulldogs.

Professional career
Smith was selected by the Chicago Cardinals of the NFL with the 142nd pick in the 1947 NFL Draft and signed with the team on March 2, 1947. He played in seven games for the Cardinals during the 1947 season. He was released by the Cardinals on May 21, 1948.

Coaching career
Smith was the head football coach at Madison County High School in Madison County, Georgia from 1948 to 1949. He served as an assistant coach at Palatka High School in 1950 and then the team's head coach from 1951 to 1962. He  was the head recruiter and running backs coach for the Florida Gators from 1963 to 1970. Smith served as the head coach of Eastside High School in Gainesville, Florida from 1971 to 1980 and won three championships. He retired after the 1980 season.

References

External links
 Just Sports Stats
 

1924 births
2013 deaths
American football defensive backs
American football halfbacks
Chicago Cardinals players
Florida Gators football coaches
Georgia Bulldogs baseball players
Georgia Bulldogs football players
High school football coaches in Florida
High school football coaches in Georgia (U.S. state)
People from Palatka, Florida
People from Polk County, Missouri
Players of American football from Florida
Baseball players from Florida